The 1998 NFL Europe season was the sixth season in 8 years of the American Football league that started out as the World League of American Football. 1998 was the first season the league was known as NFL Europe. The London Monarchs changed their names to the England Monarchs for the 1998 season.

World Bowl '98

Rhein 34-10 Frankfurt
Sunday, June 14, 1998 Waldstadion  Frankfurt, Germany

1998 in American football
NFL Europe (WLAF) seasons